The Newspaper is the largest independent student newspaper in Canada with circulation on and around the University of Toronto. It has been published by non-profit corporation Planet Publications Inc. and financially self-supported since its founding in 1978. It was briefly circulated as The Independent Weekly before returning to its original title, which is now commonly stylized as the newspaper with intentional lowercase. 

The Newspaper is officially recognized by the University of Toronto under the campus media policy of its Governing Council, a unique policy protecting the rights of independent publishers on the University of Toronto campus.

The paper currently publishes biweekly with print issues distributed across the University of Toronto St. George campus in addition to various locations in downtown Toronto.

History 
The founding editors of The Newspaper were former editors of The Varsity, Steven Petranik, Thomas Simpson and Ken Whitehurst. In The Newspaper'''s first year of publication, prominent professors at the University of Toronto contributed articles, including Allan Bloom, Denis Duffy, and Robertson Davies. In 1994, The Newspaper interviewed influential hip hop duo Gang Starr. The Newspaper's offices were originally located at 1 Spadina Crescent and were moved to 256 McCaul Street in 2013 due to renovations.

 Special editions 
Since 2003, The Newspaper's last print issue of every publishing season is a large compact alcohol-themed issue called The Boozepaper, often comprising a centerfold poster and beer reviews. There is also a Love and Sex Edition of the paper that centers around the themes of romance, sex, and dating published every February.

In November 2015, The Newspaper published a food-themed issue called The Foodpaper, though it is unknown whether this will be a recurring edition.

 Notable alumni 
Film director Atom Egoyan, novelists Rohinton Mistry and Ray Robertson, and television public affairs host Steve Paikin all contributed to The Newspaper'' while attending the University of Toronto.

See also
List of student newspapers in Canada
List of newspapers in Canada

External links
Official website

Newspapers published in Toronto
University of Toronto
Student newspapers published in Ontario
Newspapers established in 1978
Weekly newspapers published in Ontario
1978 establishments in Ontario
Biweekly newspapers published in Canada